Dragan Bajić (born 24 May 1973) is a Bosnian professional basketball coach and former player.

Early life 
Bajić was born in Bludenz, Austria, in a Bosnian Serb family.

Playing career

Basketball
Bajić played for Igokea Aleksandrovac during his playing career. In the 2000–01 season, he won the Bosnian League with them. He was a team member during the 2001–02 FIBA Saporta Cup and the 2002–03 FIBA Europe Regional Challenge Cup.

Football
Bajić played professional football as forward for Sloga Trn of the Republika Srpska First League.

Coaching career 
In 2009, Bajić started his coaching career at Igokea as the first-team head coach. Later he was an assistant coach of Igokea to the head coach Drago Karalić. 
 
In 2014, Bajić became the head coach of Bosnia and Herzegovina national under-18 team. He led the team to 12th place at the 2014 Europe U-18 Championship. From January to December 2015, he coached Cherno More Port Varna of the Bulgarian League. 

At the end of December 2015, he came back to Igokea where he became the head coach. He made interesting results in ABA League and Bosnian League. He won three Bosnian League championships with Igokea so far. On 2 April 2018, Igokea fired Bajić after the team posted a 7–15 record at the end of the 2017–18 ABA season.

On 30 October 2019, Igokea was hired Bajić as the new head coach. On 9 June 2020, Bajić signed a three-year contract extension for Igokea. He resigned on 14 January 2023, following a 5-in-a-row losses in the ABA League.

National teams 
In April 2021, the Basketball Federation of North Macedonia hired Bajić as the new head coach of the North Macedonia national team. In July 2022, he parted ways with the national team.

Career achievements and awards 
As player
 Bosnian League champion: 1 (with Igokea: 2000–01)
 First League of Republika Srpska champion: 2 (with Igokea: 1999–00, 2000–01)

As head coach
 Bosnian League champion: 4 (with Igokea: 2012–13, 2015–16, 2016–17, 2021–22)
 Bosnian Cup winner: 6 (with Igokea: 2012–13, 2015–16, 2016–17, 2017–18, 2020–21, 2021–22)
 Bulgarian Cup winner: 1 (with Cherno More: 2015)

Individual
 Adriatic League Coach of the Season – 2013, 2021

References

External links 
 Dragan Bajić at aba-liga.com
 Dragan Bajic, coach at eurobasket.com

1973 births
Living people
People from Bludenz
Serbs of Bosnia and Herzegovina
Bosnia and Herzegovina emigrants to Austria
Austrian expatriate sportspeople in Bosnia and Herzegovina
Bosnia and Herzegovina men's basketball players
Guards (basketball)
KK Igokea players
Bosnia and Herzegovina basketball coaches
KK Igokea coaches
Association football forwards
Bosnia and Herzegovina footballers
First League of the Republika Srpska players